Gaylordsville station is a former train station in Gaylordsville, Connecticut. The station building was built in the 1918, replacing the Merwinsville Hotel as the local depot, to serve passengers on the Housatonic Railroad. Shortly after its closure, the station was purchased by former New York advertising executives, Jean & Cle Kinney. In October 1971, the couple relocated the structure to a nearby hill on River Road and converted it into their own unique and creative home.

Merwinsville Hotel
Prior to the construction of the combination passenger station and freight house that would become Gaylordsville Station, the Merwinsville Hotel was the railroad station and "meal stop" serving the area. The unconventional depot was in operation as such from 1843 until 1918.

References 

Former railway stations in Connecticut
Former New York, New Haven and Hartford Railroad stations
 New Milford, Connecticut